The Ahmarian culture was a Paleolithic archeological industry in Levant dated at 46,000–42,000 BP and thought to be related to Levantine Emiran and younger European Aurignacian cultures.

The word “Ahmarian” was adopted from the archaeological site of Erq el-Ahmar (also written Erk el Ahmar), Israel, a rockshelter in the Judean Desert in the northern Dead Sea Rift. It was explored and excavated by French Prehistorian René Neuville in 1951. The "Ahmarian" category had only been recognized since the 1980s, and was previously designated as "Phase II Upper Paleolithic" or "Ksar Akil Phase B".

Ahmarian period
The Ahmarian period together with the Emiran period, both from the Levant, are among the first periods of the Upper Paleolithic, corresponding to the first stages of the expansion of Homo sapiens out of Africa. From this stage, the first modern humans migrated to Europe to form the beginning of the European Upper Paleolithic, including the Aurignacian culture, where they become known as the Cro-Magnons.

The European Bohunician culture, probably linked to the Emiran and Ahmarian, may slightly predate the Ahmarian at 48,000 BP. There is also a claim that it is roughly contemporary with the Aurignacian and the Gravettian cultures of Europe, all emerging prior to the Atlitian, which was also contemporary with the Solutrean and Magdalenian cultures of Western Europe.

Ahmarian technology, which included the complex of blade/bladelet-knapping techniques is also linked to the tools used by the hunter-gatherers of southwestern Asia.

Late Ahmarian is called Masraqan.

Technology
Ahmarian blades are usually elongated with some curves. The Levallois technique is still in use, but only sparsely, thereby making Ahmarian the first fully Upper Paleolithic period.

Ahmarian assemblages can be found throughout the Levant, including Syria, Lebanon, Israel and Jordan. The Lagaman industry in the Sinai can be considered as derivative to the Ahmarian culture.

"Levantine Aurignacian", from the Levant, is a type of blade technology very similar to the European Aurignacian, immediately following chronologically the Emiran and Early Ahmarian in the same area of the Near East, and closely related to them.

Ahmarian sites
 Erq el-Ahmar (type site)
 Manot Cave
 Boker Tachtit
 Nahal Boqer
 El-Wad
 Ksar Akil (Ahmarian Northern Facies, Lebanon)

References

Upper Paleolithic cultures
Paleolithic cultures of Asia
Prehistory of the Middle East
Archaeological cultures of West Asia
Peopling of Europe
Industries (archaeology)
Judaean Desert